"Blue Kentucky Girl" is a song written by Johnny Mullins, and originally recorded by American country music artist Loretta Lynn.  It was released in May 1965 as the first single and title track from the album Blue Kentucky Girl.  The song reached number 7 on the Billboard  Hot Country Singles & Tracks chart.

Loretta Lynn version

Chart performance

Emmylou Harris version

"Blue Kentucky Girl" was also a single for American country music artist Emmylou Harris.  Harris' version released in September 1979 as the second single and title track from her album Blue Kentucky Girl.  The song reached number 6 on the Billboard Hot Country Singles & Tracks chart.  Based on this version, the song was nominated for the Grammy Award for Best Country Song in 1980.

Chart performance

Other versions
Skeeter Davis recorded the song for her 1982 album Live Wire.

References

1965 singles
1979 singles
Loretta Lynn songs
Emmylou Harris songs
Skeeter Davis songs
Song recordings produced by Owen Bradley
Song recordings produced by Brian Ahern (producer)
Decca Records singles
Warner Records singles
1965 songs
Songs about Kentucky
Songs written by Johnny Mullins (songwriter)